The 1910–11 Drake Bulldogs men's basketball team represented Drake University in the 1910–11 college basketball season. The team was led by first year head coach A. R. Hackett. They finished with a 0–12 (0–8 MVIAA) record the previous season. That had them placing 3rd out of three teams in the MVIAA North Division. During the 1910–11 school year Washington St. Louis did not field a team, so the MVIAA didn't sponsor divisions for this school year.

Schedule

Notes 

Drake Bulldogs
Drake Bulldogs men's basketball seasons
Drake Bulldogs men's basketball
Drake Bulldogs men's basketball